PVC is polyvinyl chloride, a plastic.

PVC also may refer to:

Science and technology
 Peripheral venous catheter, intravenous tube 
 Permanent virtual circuit, in electronic networks
 Personal Voter Code, used by the INEC card reader in Nigerian national elections
 Pixel Visual Core, a programmable image processor used in mobile devices 
 Premature ventricular contraction, an abnormal heart beat
 PVC superphylum, a bacterial clade

Other uses
 Pro-vice-chancellor, a senior academic in a managerial role
 Param Vir Chakra, military honor of India 
 Provincetown Municipal Airport, (IATA airport code)

See also
 PCV (disambiguation)